The Battle of Cheongju was a battle during the Japanese invasions of Korea (1592–98). Jo Heon attacked the Japanese-held city of Cheongju and captured it on 6 September 1592.

Background
Jo Heon and the monk Yeonggyu gathered a force of 2,600 to attack Cheongju, which served as the administrative center of central Korea and contained a large government granary. It was previously taken on 4 June and was under the control of Hachisuka Iemasa.

Battle
When the Koreans attacked, some of the Japanese were still out foraging for food. The Japanese came out and fired at the Koreans, but they were surrounded and killed. The Koreans didn't know how to use the matchlock firearms, so they used them as clubs. At this point a heavy downpour started so the Koreans fell back and retreated.

The next day the Koreans discovered the Japanese had evacuated from Cheongju and took the city without a fight.

Aftermath
With Cheonju secured the Koreans moved on towards Geumsan.

References

Bibliography

 
 
 
 
 
 
 
 
 
 
 桑田忠親 [Kuwata, Tadachika], ed., 舊參謀本部編纂, [Kyu Sanbo Honbu], 朝鮮の役 [Chousen no Eki]　(日本の戰史 [Nihon no Senshi] Vol. 5), 1965.

See also
Imjin War
List of Imjin War battles
Military history of Korea
Military history of Japan

Chongju
History of North Chungcheong Province
1593 in Asia
1593 in Japan